Tafoya is the surname of:

 Arthur Tafoya (1933–2018), American Roman Catholic Bishop
 Christopher Tafoya (born 1976), American rapper, stage name Sleep
 Joe Tafoya (born 1978), American National Football League player
 Margaret Tafoya (1904–2001), Native American potter
 LuAnn Tafoya (born 1938), Native American potter
 Michele Tafoya (born 1964), American sportscaster